Anel Sudakevich (born Anna Alekseyevna Sudakevich; Russian: Анель Судакевич; December 27, 1906 – September 22, 2002) was a Soviet silent film actress.

Anna was born in a Belarusian-Polish family. She was married to Asaf Messerer. They had one son, Boris Messerer.

Filmography
Miss Mend (1926)
Pobeda zhenschiny (1927) as Marfinka
A Kiss From Mary Pickford (1927) as Dusya
Kto ty takoy? (1927)
The House on Trubnaya (1928) as Marisha - maid
The Yellow Ticket (1928) as Anya - Baron's married daughter
Storm Over Asia (1928) as Commandant's blonde daughter
Dva-Buldi-dva (1929)
Agony (film) (1981)

See also
Vera Kholodnaya
Igor Ilyinsky
Vera Karalli

References

External links

 Magazine with postcards: Interview with Anel Sudakevich - 1997. «Women of century». № 4492

1906 births
2002 deaths
Actresses from Moscow
People from Moscow Governorate
Russian film actresses
Russian silent film actresses
Soviet film actresses
Soviet silent film actresses
20th-century Russian actresses